Don Mills is a subway station that is the eastern terminus of Line 4 Sheppard in Toronto, Ontario, Canada. The station is at the northeast corner of Sheppard Avenue East and Don Mills Road, within the residential communities of Don Valley Village and Henry Farm, adjacent to Fairview Mall shopping centre. The station is close to Highways 401 and   404, as well as the Don Valley Parkway. Other nearby landmarks include Fairview Mall, Georges Vanier Secondary School, and the Fairview district branch of the Toronto Public Library.

History
The station opened in 2002 as part of the original Line 4. A plaque at the platform level commemorates John Marinzel, a worker who died on April 18, 2001, of injuries from an accident during the construction of the station. A Vivastation for the Viva Green line of York Region's Viva Rapid Transit system opened on October 16, 2005.

Description
Like all stations on the Sheppard line, Don Mills is fully accessible. The station is equipped with three elevators connecting the concourse level with the bus platforms and two street entrances, and a single elevator between the island train platform and the concourse. Stairs and escalators provide regular pedestrian access between all levels.

There are three accessible entrances around the Don Mills Road and Sheppard Avenue intersection. Two of the entrances are on the northeast and southeast sides of Sheppard Avenue, respectively, and one automatic entrance in the parking garage at Fairview Mall near the Marshalls/HomeSense entrance.

Above the bus terminal, on the street level, is a multi-storey public parking lot with 366 parking spaces for commuters. Parking costs $7 from 5:00am to 9:30am and is free after 9:30am and all day on weekends and holidays. TTC commuter spaces are restricted to levels 4 and 5 as the lower floors are for mall patrons only.

Outside the parking lot, next to a staffed pedestrian entrance to the station, is a passenger pick-up area with 18 temporary parking spaces.

Subway infrastructure in the vicinity 
 As this is a terminal station, there is a diamond crossover to the west of the platform for arriving trains to cross over to the westbound track, and for departing trains on the eastbound track to cross to the westbound track. There are also tail tracks beyond the east end of the platform. However, unlike other terminal stations where the tail tracks are at least as long as a standard six-car train for overnight storage, those at Don Mills are only about two cars in length. This is likely because storage capacity is available at Sheppard–Yonge, which can store enough trains to service the line.

Architecture and art

The station was designed by Stevens Group Architects, who also built  and  stations.

There are two pieces of public art in the station. The piece before / after: 1997 / 2002 spans the concourse and platform levels in the station. Created by Toronto artist Stephen Cruise, it consists of tile work on walls and inlays on the terrazzo floors:
On the concourse level, the tilework on walls represents the geologic strata through which the line travels, plus graphical depictions of local flora and fauna.
On the concourse and platform levels, bronze inlays in the floor depict fossils of fish, turtles, and leaves found on the site; the Sheppard line is also depicted in an abstract form on the floor.

Outside the station (on the north side of Don Mills Road, south of the bus entrance) is a tribute to Northern Dancer, a famous racehorse foaled at E. P. Taylor's Windfields Farm, which was then located on "nearby" Bayview Avenue.

In mid-2021, to celebrate the TTC's 100th anniversary, a temporary art installation titled Sheppard Subway Construction was put on display at the station. Located on the concourse level, the installation consisted of various enlarged photographs showcasing the construction of Line 4 Sheppard.

Surface connections
Don Mills station has a bus terminal that is also underground. It allows for connection to both TTC bus routes and York Region Transit (YRT) routes.

Toronto Transit Commission routes

When the subway is closed, passengers may board buses at the intersection of Don Mills Road and Sheppard Avenue outside the station.

York Region Transit routes

York Region Transit vehicles drops passengers off outside of the station. The bus stops within the terminal are for passenger pick up only. This is to ensure passengers pay a separate fare when transferring between YRT and TTC services.

Prior proposals
As part of the Transit City plan, the TTC proposed the construction of the Sheppard LRT (light rail transit) line to connect Don Mills station to Sheppard East station on the proposed extension of Line 3 Scarborough. This replaced previous plans to extend Line 4 Sheppard to Scarborough Centre station on Line 3.

The Transit City plan included an LRT along Don Mills Road from Pape station on Line 2 Bloor–Danforth through Don Mills station to Steeles Avenue. However, the transit line, along with other Transit City lines, was cancelled by Rob Ford when he became mayor in December 2010.

In a 2015 study, one of the options for a proposed Toronto relief line connected to Don Mills Station.

References

External links

Line 4 Sheppard stations
York Region Transit Terminals
Railway stations in Canada opened in 2002
2002 establishments in Ontario